Mariano Hugo, Prince of Windisch-Graetz (German: Mariano Hugo Fürst zu Windisch-Graetz, Italian: Principe Mariano Ugo di Windisch-Graetz; born 27 July 1955) is the current head of the Austrian House of Windisch-Graetz. He is currently a member of the Grand Magisterium of the Equestrian Order of the Holy Sepulchre of Jerusalem. A former ambassador of the Sovereign Military Order of Malta to Slovakia, he is also currently the Order's ambassador to Slovenia. He also sits on the council of the Dynastic orders of knighthood for the Royal House of Savoy.

Upbringing and family 
Windisch-Graetz was born at Trieste as the elder son of Maximilian Antonius, Prince of Windisch-Graetz and Donna Maria Luisa "Marilise" Serra di Gerace. His mother was the legitimatised daughter of Gian Battista Serra, 12th Prince of Gerace and Donna Maria Grazia Carafa d'Andria . He has two sisters and one brother: Christiana "Irma" married to Don Augusto Ruffo di Calabria (nephew of Queen Paola of Belgium), Maximiliane married with Prince Heinrich zu Fürstenberg and Manfred married with Maria Vittoria Lepri di Rota.

Windisch-Graetz was educated in Rome at the school of the De La Salle Brothers. In 1975 he graduated from University College of Buckingham with a degree in Philosophy, Economics and Political Science.

When his father died in 1976, Windisch-Graetz succeeded as head of a cadet branch of the House of Windisch-Graetz, a mediatised house whose members historically bore the style of "Serene Highness".

On 11 February 1990 in Salzburg, Austria, Windisch-Graetz married Archduchess Sophie of Austria, daughter of Archduke Ferdinand Karl Max of Austria and Countess Helene zu Toerring-Jettenbach (de), daughter of Princess Elizabeth of Greece and Denmark. The couple have had two sons and one daughter:
 Prince Maximilian Hugo (born 4 August 1990 in Salzburg);
 Prince Alexis Ferdinand (born 7 December 1991 in Rome - died 9 February 2010 in Sant'Angelo d'Alife); 
 Princess Larissa Maria Grazia Helen Leontina Maria Luisa (born 11 November 1996 in Rome).

Windisch-Graetz and his family reside in Italy when he is not abroad on diplomatic appointment, maintaining a home in Rome and another in Sant'Angelo d'Alife.

Activities and appointments 

The business activities of Windisch-Graetz include the food production industry, notably biscuits and mozzarella cheese, and entrepreneurial finance. In the early 1990s, he was a major shareholder in the Banco di Napoli and a holding company, Sogesco, of which he owned 82%, was capitalised at 10 billion lire.

On 19 December 1987, Pope John Paul II appointed Windisch-Graetz a Gentleman of His Holiness, a role which entails meeting visiting heads of state and ambassadors and escorting them to meet the pope. He is also a Knight of Honour and Devotion in Obedience of the Sovereign Military Order of Malta.

In 2003, Windisch-Graetz was appointed Ambassador of the Sovereign Military Order of Malta to the Republic of Slovakia; this appointment was renewed in 2006, until December 2009. In March 2009, he was appointed Ambassador of the Sovereign Military Order of Malta to the Republic of Slovenia.

On 9 June, 2021, Windisch-Graetz was appointed to the Grand Magisterium of the Equestrian Order of the Holy Sepulchre of Jerusalem by the Grand Master of the Order, Fernando Cardinal Filoni. Windisch-Graetz is a Knight Grand Officer of the Order since 1980.

Honours and awards
:
Knight of Honour and Devotion in Obedience of the Sovereign Military Order of Malta
Grand Cross of the Order pro merito Melitensi  
: Knight Grand Officer of the Order of the Holy Sepulchre  
: Grand Officer of the Order of Ouissam Alaouite
 House of Habsburg-Lorraine: Knight of the Austrian Order of the Golden Fleece 
 House of Bourbon-Two Sicilies: Knight of Justice of the Sacred Military Constantinian Order of Saint George
 House of Braganza: Knight Grand Officer of the Order of Saint Michael of the Wing  
 House of Petrović-Njegoš: Knight Commander of the Order of Prince Danilo I  
 House of Savoy:
Knight of the Collar of the Supreme Order of the Most Holy Annunciation
Knight of Grand Cross of the Order of Saints Maurice and Lazarus
Knight Grand Cross of the Order of Merit of Savoy

References

1955 births
Living people
Ambassadors of the Sovereign Military Order of Malta to Slovakia
Knights of Malta
Recipients of the Order pro Merito Melitensi
Knights of the Golden Fleece of Austria
Knights of the Holy Sepulchre
Mariano
Papal gentlemen
Italian people of Austrian descent